Final Witness is an American crime drama television series that premiered on June 27, 2012, on ABC.

The seven-part series, which combines documentary and drama elements, focuses on a different real-life murder each week from the victim's point of view. Each episode includes interviews with the victim's family and friends, real witnesses, prosecutors, and law enforcement officers, as well as scripted scenes with actors.

Episodes

U.S. Nielsen ratings
The following is a table for the United States ratings, based on average total estimated viewers per episode, of Final Witness on ABC.

Critical reception 
The series received mixed reviews from critics. Jessica Shaw of Entertainment Weekly stated that "Crime reenactments are equal parts disturbing and cheesymediocre actors portraying cold-blooded killers and their victims. This new ripped-from-the-headlines series amps up the cheese even further by mixing Desperate Housewives-style narration with actual non-reenacted interviews."
The New York Posts Linda Stasi called the series "a good true-crime show. A very good true-crime show. But that voice-from-beyond narrator is just so very wrong."
Verne Gay of Newsday also commented on the narration by writing that the series is "a grim, macabre march through a terrible crime, deploying a bad twistthe voice of the deceased."
The New York Daily News David Hinckley thought the series was "crisply and professionally produced. But the best face it can put on terrible murder cases is philosophical, and that may not be enough to keep viewers from the somber takeaway that someone they like has ended up dead."

References

External links

2010s American crime television series
2012 American television series debuts
2012 American television series endings
American Broadcasting Company original programming
American television docudramas
English-language television shows